Iglesia de Santa María (Limanes) is a church in Asturias, Spain.

References

Churches in Asturias